David John Cox (born 1 March 1973) is a former Scottish international cricketer who represented the Scottish national side between 1999 and 2001. He played as a right-arm pace bowler.

Cox began his club career in Scotland with the Aberdeen-based Aberdeenshire Cricket Club, but later switched to The Grange Club (based in Edinburgh). He made his debut for the national team in August 1999, playing a first-class match against a South Africa Academy team. The following year, he represented Scotland at the ICC Emerging Nations Challenge in Zimbabwe, although he took only a single wicket from four games. At the 2001 ICC Trophy in Canada, Cox played in three of Scotland's ten games, taking wickets against Singapore (1/19 from eight overs) and Canada (1/40 from eight overs). He made his final appearances for Scotland later in the year, playing C&G Trophy games against the Middlesex Cricket Board and Dorset.

References

External links
Player profile and statistics at CricketArchive
Player profile and statistics at ESPNcricinfo

1973 births
Living people
Scottish cricketers
Cricketers from Coventry